Madu Chandra was a Meitei royal who ruled between 1801 and 1806. He fought for power during the dynastic squabbles in Manipur after the death of Ching-Thang Khomba.

See also
List of Manipuri kings
Manipur (princely state)

References

Bibliography
Hodson, Thomas Callan.The Meitheis. Harvard University, 1908.

Meitei royalty
Hindu monarchs